Yemi Akinseye George, SAN (born 1963) is a Nigerian professor of public law and president of the Center for Socio-Legal Studies. He is the principal partner of Yemi Akinseye-George & Partners, a firm which provides qualitative legal and consultancy services to individuals, corporate bodies, and governments within and outside Nigeria.

Early life
George was born on 1963 in Ondo State, Nigeria.
He obtained a Bachelor of Law (LLB) in 1985 and a Master of Law (LLM) from the University of Lagos. He was called to the Nigerian Bar as a Barrister and Solicitor of the Supreme Court of Nigeria in 1986.
After he completed his National Youth Service Corps in 1986, he proceeded to the University of Lagos where he obtained a master's degree in public law.

Career
In 1989, he joined the University of Ibadan, where he became a senior lecturer. 
After eight years of academic service at the University of Ibadan, he received a fellowship at the Davis Centre at Princeton University. He conducted research on corruption and constitutionalism in Africa at Princeton (1997-1998).
In 2003, he was appointed Special Adviser to the Ministers of Justice and Attorneys-General of the Federal Republic of Nigeria. While serving in this capacity, he was appointed as a professor of public law at Adekunle Ajasin University in Ondo State in December 2004. He served as dean of the faculty of law at the university.
In July 2012, he became a Senior Advocate of Nigeria, alongside Femi Falana and 22 others. He has, since his call to bar actively combined scholarship with Legal practice.

Membership
He is a member of the following professional bodies:
Member of the Nigerian Bar Association
Member of the Law professors Network, University of Pittsburgh
Member of the International Society for the Reform of Criminal Law
Member of the Nigerian Society of International Law
Member of the Network of University Legal Aid Institutions
Senior Advocate of Nigeria
Member of the Council of Legal Education in Nigeria
Board member Legal Defence and Assistance Project

See also
List of Senior Advocates of Nigeria

References

Living people
1963 births
Senior Advocates of Nigeria
University of Lagos alumni
Academic staff of the University of Ibadan
Princeton University faculty
Nigerian expatriate academics in the United States
People from Ekiti State
20th-century Nigerian lawyers
Academic staff of Adekunle Ajasin University
21st-century Nigerian lawyers